The A Shau Valley (Vietnamese: thung lũng A Sầu) is a valley in Vietnam's Thừa Thiên-Huế Province, west of the coastal city of Huế, along the border of Laos. The valley runs north and south for 40 kilometers and is a 1.5-kilometer-wide flat bottomland covered with tall elephant grass, flanked by two densely forested mountain ridges whose summits vary in elevation from 900 to 1,800 meters. A Shau Valley was one of the key entry points into South Vietnam for men and material brought along the Ho Chi Minh trail by the North Vietnamese Army and was the scene of heavy fighting during the Vietnam War. The A Shau Valley is bisected lengthwise by Route 548. The Ho Chi Minh Highway now runs along the valley floor.

See also

Battle of A Shau
Battle of Fire Support Base Ripcord
Battle of Hamburger Hill
Battle of Signal Hill Vietnam
Dong Ap Bia
Dong Re Lao Mountain
Operation Apache Snow
Operation Delaware
Operation Dewey Canyon
Operation Somerset Plain

References

External links

Battlefields in Vietnam
Landforms of Thừa Thiên Huế province
Valleys of Vietnam